Mespilus canescens, commonly known as Stern's medlar, is a large shrub or small tree, recently discovered in Prairie County, Arkansas, United States, and formally named in 1990. It is a critically endangered endemic species, with only 25 plants known, all in one small (9 ha) wood, now protected as the Konecny Grove Natural Area.

It has been shown by genetic analysis to be closely related to the common medlar Mespilus germanica, which was previously the only known species in the genus. Subsequent molecular analyses suggest that Stern's medlar is likely a hybrid between cultivated M. germanica and one or two native North American species of Crataegus.

Description
The five-petalled white flowers are produced in late spring. The fruit is an almost spherical pome,  diameter; it differs from common medlar fruit in being deep glossy red when ripe (not brown).

See also
 Flora of Arkansas

References

External links
 Center for Plant Conservation: Mespilus canescens
 Phipps, J.B., Weeden, N.F., & Dickson, E.E. 1991. Isozyme evidence for the naturalness of Mespilus L. (Rosaceae, subfam. Maldoideae). Systematic Botany 16: 546-552.

canescens
Flora of Arkansas
Trees of the Southeastern United States
Critically endangered flora of the United States
Plants described in 1990
Endemic flora of the United States